Ang Mo Kio Bus Interchange is located in Ang Mo Kio Town Centre, Singapore. The interchange is within AMK Hub which is in turn linked to Ang Mo Kio MRT station via a pedestrian underpass below Ang Mo Kio Avenue 8. The interchange was opened by Prime Minister Lee Hsien Loong.

The interchange is the third to be fully air-conditioned in Singapore after the Toa Payoh Bus Interchange and the Sengkang Bus Interchange, and similarly features automated sliding doors at each of its six berths that will open only when the bus reaches the berths.

History

Original interchange
Plans for the bus interchange were first announced in March 1979, as part of the Singapore Bus Service's (SBS) efforts to rationalise the Singapore bus system. Constructed by the Housing and Development Board (HDB), the bus park of the interchange was completed in 1979.
In January 1980, bus services that previously terminated at a bus terminus along Ang Mo Kio Avenue 6 were amended to the interchange, but passengers were not allowed to board or alight at the interchange. Due to concerns over the interchange's small size making it unsafe for commuters, in August 1980, SBS announced that it would be replacing the interchange with a larger facility. To facilitate the interchange's construction, the HDB granted permission to SBS to utilise half of a plot of land beside the interchange and another plot then occupied by a carpark.

Work on the replacement bus interchange commenced in January 1981, and operations at the new interchange commenced on 10 April 1983.

Current interchange
In 2001, the government announced plans to redevelop the bus interchange to form part of an integrated development, and to make way for the development, the interchange was moved to a temporary location along Ang Mo Kio Avenue 8 in March 2002. Construction of the integrated development was delayed by a dispute between the developer and the government over the price of the land parcel, only beginning in March 2005. Subsequently, the new bus interchange within the integrated development started operations in April 2007.

Bus Contracting Model

Under the new bus contracting model, all the bus routes were split into 8 route packages. Bus Service 136 is under Loyang Bus Package, Bus Service 22 is under TBC Bus Package, Bus Service 25 is under Bedok Bus Package, Bus Service 169 is under Sembawang-Yishun Bus Package, Bus Service 86 is under Sengkang-Hougang Bus Package, Bus Service 166 is under Clementi Bus Package, Bus Service 73 is under Bishan-Toa Payoh Bus Package and the rest of the bus services are under Seletar Bus Package.

Currently, Bus Service 136 (Loyang Bus Package) is operated by Go-Ahead Singapore. Bus Service 169 (Sembawang-Yishun Bus Package) is currently operated by Tower Transit Singapore. All remaining bus services are operated by the anchor operator, SBS Transit.

List of routes

References

External links

 

2007 establishments in Singapore
Bus stations in Singapore
Buildings and structures in Ang Mo Kio
Transport in North-East Region, Singapore